Tukialik Short Range Radar Site (LAB-5) is a Royal Canadian Air Force Short Range Radar Site located in eastern Labrador,  northeast of CFB Goose Bay, Newfoundland and Labrador, Canada.

Facilities
The facility contains a Short Range AN/FPS-124 doppler airborne target surveillance radar that was installed in October 1992 as part of the North Warning System. The site (LAB-5) also consists of radar towers, communications facility, and storage and tunnel connected buildings for personnel.

See also
 North Warning System
 Pinetree Line

References

External links
About NORAD Public information
Radar Information AN/FPS-117 Radar information from FAS
Technical Radar Information AN/FPS-124 Radar information from FAS

Military installations in Newfoundland and Labrador
Royal Canadian Air Force stations
Canadian Forces bases in Newfoundland and Labrador